is a Japanese footballer currently playing as a forward for Giravanz Kitakyushu.

Career statistics

Club
.

Notes

References

External links

1998 births
Living people
Association football people from Saitama Prefecture
Hosei University alumni
Japanese footballers
Association football forwards
J2 League players
Giravanz Kitakyushu players